"The Electrician" is a song written by American singer-songwriter Scott Walker. The song was first recorded and released by Walker's pop group The Walker Brothers as their fourteenth UK single and last official release while the group were still active in 1978. The single did not chart. The song describes the work of a CIA torturer.

Midge Ure is said to have been influenced by "The Electrician" when composing "Vienna" for Ultravox.

"The Electrician" was featured as the opening track for the 2008 crime film Bronson directed by Nicolas Winding Refn. In 2019, the song was featured in Episode 4 of On Becoming a God in Central Florida, Season 1.

The song was covered by Laurie Anderson for the Scott Walker tribute album Scott Walker: 30 Century Man in 2009.

Track listing

Personnel
 "The Electrician"
 John Walker and Scott Walker – Vocals
 Frank Gibson – Drums
 Dill Katz – Bass
 Morris Pert – Percussion
 Jim Sullivan – Guitar

 "Den Haague"
 Gary Walker – Vocals
 Scott Walker and Dave MacRae – Keyboards
 Peter Van Hooke – Drums
 Mo Foster and Scott Walker – Bass
 Gary Walker – Percussion
 Dennis Weinreich – Background Vocals

 Technical and visual
 The Walker Brothers – Arrangements
 Dave MacRae – Orchestrations and Conductor
 Scott Walker and Dave MacRae – Producer
 Dennis Weinreich – Recording
 Scott Walker, Dave MacRae and Dennis Weinreich – Mixing
 Hipgnosis and The Walker Brothers – Sleeve Design

References

Songs about occupations
1978 singles
The Walker Brothers songs
Songs written by Scott Walker (singer)
1978 songs
GTO Records singles